Below are the rosters for the 1987 FIFA World Youth Championship tournament in Chile. Those marked in bold went on to earn full international caps.

Group A

Head coach: Les Scheinflug

Head coach: Luis Ibarra

Head coach:  Rainer Wilfeld

Head coach: Mirko Jozić

Group B

Head coach: Gilson Nunes

Head coach:  Tony Taylor

Head coach: Giuseppe Lupi

Head coach: Christopher Udemezue

Group C

Head coach: Salman Ahmed Sharida

Head coach: José Finot Castano

Head coach: Eberhard Vogel

Head coach: Ross Mathie

Group D

Head coach: Hristo Andonov

Head coach:  Oswaldo Sempaio

Head coach: Berti Vogts

Head coach:  Derek Armstrong

References 
FIFA pages on the 1987 World Youth Championship

Fifa World Youth Championship Squads, 1987
FIFA U-20 World Cup squads